Frank Hose (29 October 1920 – 14 October 1992) was an  Australian rules footballer who played with Geelong in the Victorian Football League (VFL).

Notes

External links 

1920 births
1992 deaths
Australian rules footballers from Victoria (Australia)
Geelong Football Club players
Newtown & Chilwell Football Club players